Willan Bouza (born 22 August 1961) is a Uruguayan judoka. He competed in the men's half-heavyweight event at the 1996 Summer Olympics.

References

1961 births
Living people
Uruguayan male judoka
Olympic judoka of Uruguay
Judoka at the 1996 Summer Olympics
Place of birth missing (living people)